The Anarchist was a monthly newspaper produced in London, England between 1885–1888. Henry Albert Seymour, a leading individualist anarchist was the editor throughout its production. The Anarchist is notable for being the first English-language Anarchist periodical in Britain. The paper was printed in London, although the initial idea and planning took place in Tunbridge Wells, Kent. Seymour lived in Tunbridge Wells until early 1885, and there is correspondence between George Bernard Shaw and Seymour discussing the first edition which shows that Seymour was still living in Tunbridge Wells when the first issue was being prepared.

References

Bibliography
 
 
 

1885 establishments in the United Kingdom
1888 disestablishments in the United Kingdom
Anarchist periodicals published in the United Kingdom
Publications established in 1885
Publications disestablished in 1888